Eupithecia alliaria is a moth in the  family Geometridae. It is found from France and the Iberian Peninsula east through south-central Europe to Russia and most of the Balkan Peninsula. It is also found in the Near East and North Africa.

The wingspan is 24–28 mm. Adults are on wing from May to August.

The larvae feed on Allium species.

Subspecies
Eupithecia alliaria alliaria
Eupithecia alliaria notata Dietze, 1910

References

External links

Lepiforum.de

Moths described in 1870
alliaria
Moths of Europe
Moths of Asia
Moths of Africa
Taxa named by Otto Staudinger